Edgeley is a city in LaMoure County, North Dakota, United States. The population was 585 at the 2020 census.

History
Edgeley was founded in 1886 by Richard Sykes, a landowner from England who named it after Edgeley, Cheshire, where he was born.

Geography
Edgeley is located at  (46.359415, -98.712201).

Demographics

Edgeley offers modern recreational facilities, an excellent school system and a full service business district.  Edgeley Public School educates preschool thru 12th grade students. It enrolls between 200 and 300 kids yearly.

2010 census
As of the census of 2010, there were 563 people, 262 households, and 161 families residing in the city. The racial makeup of the city was 99.5% White, 0.2% Asian, 0.2% from other races, and 0.2% from two or more races. Hispanic or Latino of any race were 1.2% of the population.

There were 262 households, of which 22.5% had children under the age of 18 living with them, 50.0% were married couples living together, 8.0% had a female householder with no husband present, 3.4% had a male householder with no wife present, and 38.5% were non-families. 37.0% of all households were made up of individuals, and 19.8% had someone living alone who was 65 years of age or older. The average household size was 2.06 and the average family size was 2.67.

The median age in the city was 51.3 years. 20.1% of residents were under the age of 18; 3.5% were between the ages of 18 and 24; 14.7% were from 25 to 44; 32.8% were from 45 to 64; and 28.8% were 65 years of age or older. The gender makeup of the city was 48.8% male and 51.2% female.

2000 census
As of the census of 2000, there were 637 people, 293 households, and 162 families residing in the city. The population density was 870.1 people per square mile (336.9/km2). There were 336 housing units at an average density of 458.9 per square mile (177.7/km2). The racial makeup of the city was 99.37% White, and 0.63% from two or more races. Hispanic or Latino of any race were 0.63% of the population.

There were 293 households, out of which 24.6% had children under the age of 18 living with them, 50.2% were married couples living together, 4.4% had a female householder with no husband present, and 44.4% were non-families. 43.0% of all households were made up of individuals, and 26.3% had someone living alone who was 65 years of age or older. The average household size was 2.07 and the average family size was 2.89.

In the city, the population was spread out, with 21.7% under the age of 18, 3.6% from 18 to 24, 21.4% from 25 to 44, 23.1% from 45 to 64, and 30.3% who were 65 years of age or older. The median age was 47 years. For every 100 females, there were 85.7 males. For every 100 females age 18 and over, there were 85.5 males.

The median income for a household in the city was $29,000, and the median income for a family was $37,375. Males had a median income of $30,735 versus $17,115 for females. The per capita income for the city was $21,570. About 1.8% of families and 3.6% of the population were below the poverty line, including 2.2% of those under age 18 and 6.7% of those age 65 or over.

Notable people
Hiram Cornwell, served in the Wisconsin State Assembly in 1873, lived and died in Edgeley.
Tim Mathern, served in the North Dakota Senate since 1987, grew up in Edgeley
Glenn Truesdell, served in the Minnesota House of Representatives 1959–1960, was born in Edgeley.
Science fiction artist John Berkey was born in Edgeley in 1932.

Climate
This climatic region is typified by large seasonal temperature differences, with warm to hot (and often humid) summers and cold (sometimes severely cold) winters.  According to the Köppen Climate Classification system, Edgeley has a humid continental climate, abbreviated "Dfb" on climate maps.

References

External links
My town, my people, 1887-1962 from the Digital Horizons website
Edgeley, North Dakota : community fact survey (1964) from the Digital Horizons website

Cities in North Dakota
Cities in LaMoure County, North Dakota
Populated places established in 1886
1886 establishments in Dakota Territory